Craig John Winter (born 30 June 1976) is a retired Scottish footballer who made over 240 appearances in the Scottish League for Cowdenbeath as a midfielder. He also played League football for Brechin City, Dumbarton, Raith Rovers, Forfar Athletic and East Stirlingshire. After retiring as a player, he entered coaching and management.

Career statistics

Honours 
Cowdenbeath

 Scottish League First Division play-offs: 2009–10
Scottish League Second Division: 2011–12
Scottish League Third Division second-place promotion: 2000–01

Brechin City

 Scottish League Second Division: 2004–05

Individual

Cowdenbeath Hall of Fame

References

External links 

 

1976 births
Scottish footballers
Dumbarton F.C. players
Cowdenbeath F.C. players
Brechin City F.C. players
Raith Rovers F.C. players
Forfar Athletic F.C. players
East Stirlingshire F.C. players
Living people
Hill of Beath Hawthorn F.C. players
Ballingry Rovers F.C. players
Glenrothes F.C. players
Cowdenbeath F.C. non-playing staff
Scottish football managers
Scottish Football League players
Association football midfielders
Footballers from Dunfermline
Lothian Thistle Hutchison Vale F.C. players